Al Jumail is an abandoned village inhabited by Alkubaisi tribe in north-east Qatar located in the municipality of Al Shamal. It was an important town in the northern peninsula prior to the 21st century.

Nearby settlements include Ruwayda to the south-west and Yusufiyah and Abu Dhalouf to the north.

Etymology
The town's name comes from the Arabic word "jameel", which means "beautiful"; a reference to the trees that grow in the area year-round.

Various alternative transliterations of the name are used, such as Al Jemail, Al Jamil, Lumail, and Yamail.

History
In the 1820s, George Barnes Brucks was tasked with preparing the first British survey of the Persian Gulf. He documented Al Jumail in this survey, referring to it as "Yamale" and concisely stating that "Yamale, in lat. 26° 5' 40" N., long. 51° 14' E., is a small village."

Gallery

References

Al Shamal